Paul Bush may refer to:

 Paul Bush (filmmaker) (born 1956), British experimental film director and animator
 Paul Bush (Royal Navy officer) (1855–1930)
 Paul Bush (bishop) (1490–1558), English Augustinian and first bishop of Bristol
 Paul Bush (sports administrator), chair of Commonwealth Games Scotland